Valberg is a village in the municipality of Stokke, Norway. Its population (SSB 2005) is 506.

Villages in Vestfold og Telemark